Rubinacci is an Italian luxury clothing company. It may also refer to:

Surname

People
Jack Rubinacci (born 31 August 1975) is an Anglo-Italian musical artist
Leopoldo Rubinacci (1903–1969) Italian politician and lawyer

Fictional characters
Rossella Rubinacci, main character in the 1962 Italian film A Girl... and a Million